Elizabeth Marshall  (born September 7, 1951) is a Canadian politician and member of the Senate.

Background
Elizabeth Marshall was born in Stephenville Crossing, Newfoundland and Labrador. She received her early education in St. Lawrence, Corner Brook, and Grand Falls-Windsor. Marshall holds a Bachelor of Science (Math) degree from Memorial University of Newfoundland. She became a chartered accountant in 1979, and spent a number of years working in the provincial public service. She is a former Deputy Minister of Social Services and Deputy Minister of Works, Services, and Transportation. Marshall also spent a decade as Newfoundland and Labrador's Auditor General, from 1992 to 2002. She is married to businessperson Stan Marshall, the President and CEO of Nalcor Energy since April 2016, and they reside in Conception Bay South.

Provincial politics
In March 2003, Marshall became the Progressive Conservative (PC Party) candidate in the district of Topsail, when she easily defeated Gerald Spracklin in a nomination battle. In the provincial election held that October Marshall defeated Liberal incumbent Ralph Wiseman, who had been serving as the Minister of Human Resources and Employment.

Following the election Premier Danny Williams appointed Marshall as the Minister of Health and Community Services. Less than a year later in September 2004, she tendered her resignation as minister, citing Williams managerial style. Marshall stated that Williams had made decisions regarding her portfolio without consulting her, with the most recent example being a decision to provide more money to end a VON strike in Corner Brook. Marshall continued to sit as a member of the House of Assembly (MHA) in the PC caucus, and stated that she agreed with the direction of the government.

In January 2007, Marshall stated that she planned on seeking re-election as the MHA for Topsail in that year's election and said she enjoyed her work outside of cabinet. She also dismissed rumours that she planned on seeking the Conservative Party of Canada nomination in the riding of St. John's East, although she admitted to being approached about running in the previous federal election.

Federal politics
On January 29, 2010, Prime Minister Stephen Harper appointed Marshall to the Senate of Canada as a Conservative. On May 25, 2011, she was appointed Government Whip, succeeding Consiglio Di Nino.  In November 2013 she seconded the Martin motion that led to the suspension of Senators Patrick Brazeau, Mike Duffy and Pamela Wallin.

References

External links

1951 births
Living people
Canadian accountants
20th-century Canadian civil servants
Memorial University of Newfoundland alumni
Progressive Conservative Party of Newfoundland and Labrador MHAs
Women MHAs in Newfoundland and Labrador
Canadian senators from Newfoundland and Labrador
Conservative Party of Canada senators
Women members of the Senate of Canada
People from Conception Bay South
Canadian women civil servants
Health ministers of Newfoundland and Labrador
21st-century Canadian politicians
21st-century Canadian women politicians